The Tokarev Sportowy is a Tokarev TT-33 training semi-automatic pistol produced in Poland and used within the former Warsaw Pact countries. While the barrel is sized to receive a .22 caliber projectile, the chamber and magazine are sized to receive 7.62×25mm Tokarev cartridges. Typically, .22 LR cartridges are inserted into a hollow 7.62×25mm Tokarev shaped cartridge, which is then loaded into the firearm.

References

Sources 
 журнал «Оружие», № 7, 2003 (спецвыпуск журнала, полностью посвящён описанию пистолетов ТТ).
 Tokarev v ráži 22 LR // «Střelecká revue», 5, 2007

Semi-automatic pistols of Poland
.22 LR pistols